Georges Coudray (2 June 1902, in Évran, Côtes d'Armor – 18 January 1998 in Saint Malo) was a French politician, and a deputy to the French National Assembly for the Popular Republican Movement.

He was the last mayor of Paramé before its merger with the city of Saint Malo. He was also one of the  pioneers of affordable housing after World War II.

Sources
 Biography on the French Parliament website

1902 births
1998 deaths
People from Côtes-d'Armor
Popular Republican Movement politicians
Members of the Constituent Assembly of France (1945)
Members of the Constituent Assembly of France (1946)
Deputies of the 1st National Assembly of the French Fourth Republic
Deputies of the 2nd National Assembly of the French Fourth Republic
Deputies of the 1st National Assembly of the French Fifth Republic
Mayors of places in Brittany